Calymmaderus nitidus is a species of beetle in the family Ptinidae.

References

Further reading

External links

 

Ptinidae
Beetles described in 1865